Javier Jáuregui or Jauregui can refer to:

 Javier Jáuregui (boxer) (1973-2013), Mexican boxer
 Javier Jauregui (footballer) (born 1975), Spanish footballer